Sydbank Arena (previously known as Odense Idrætshal) is a complex of indoor sports arenas in Odense, Denmark used for several sports, but primarily handball and badminton. The arena is home to Danish Women's Handball League team Odense Håndbold.

It has also been used for badminton tournaments, national and international events. Denmark Open, has been played every year since 2009.

Since August 2020, the official name of the arena has been Sydbank Arena for sponsorship reasons.

References

External links 

Information about the arena on odensehaandbold.dk

Handball venues in Denmark
Indoor arenas in Denmark
Odense Municipality